HTT may refer to:

 Hawthorn Tramways Trust, a defunct tram operator in Melbourne, Australia
 Higher Topos Theory, a treatise on higher category theory by American mathematician Jacob Lurie.
 Ho-kago Tea Time (English: After School Tea Time), the name of the school band from the manga and anime K-On!
 Huatugou Airport, in Qinghai, China
 Human Terrain Team of the United States Army
 The gene that encodes Huntingtin
 Hybrid turbocharger
 Hyper-threading
 Hyperloop Transportation Technologies, an American technology company